Àlex Corretja was the defending champion but lost in the second round to Christophe Rochus.

Juan Ignacio Chela won in the final 6–1, 7–6(7–4) against Albert Costa.

Seeds
A champion seed is indicated in bold while text in italics indicates the round in which that seed was eliminated.

  Albert Costa (final)
  Juan Ignacio Chela (champion)
  Gastón Gaudio (semifinals)
  Àlex Corretja (second round)
  Jarkko Nieminen (quarterfinals)
  Fernando González (first round)
  Mariano Zabaleta (first round)
  Olivier Rochus (first round)

Draw

References
 2002 Energis Open Draw

Dutch Open (tennis)
2002 ATP Tour
2002 Dutch Open (tennis)